Ottawa West—Nepean is a federal electoral district in Ontario, Canada, that has been represented in the House of Commons of Canada since 1997.

Geography
The district includes the neighbourhoods of Shirleys Bay, Crystal Beach, Rocky Point, Bayshore, Britannia, Britannia Bay, Lincoln Heights, Whitehaven, Glabar Park, Queensway, Kenson Park, Redwood, Graham Park, Qualicum, Leslie Park, Briargreen, Centrepointe, Woodroffe, Bel-Air Park, Bel-Air Heights, Braemar Park, Copeland Park, Navaho, City View, Ryan Farm, Skyline, Fisher Heights, Parkwood Hills, Carleton Heights, Fisher Glen, Borden Farm, Crestview, Meadowlands, Woodpark, and the western half of Carlington in the City of Ottawa.

History
The electoral district was created in 1996 from Ottawa West, Nepean and part of Lanark—Carleton ridings.

The 2012 federal redistribution saw the riding gain a small portion from Ottawa Centre, but it remained largely unchanged.

Demographics 
According to the 2021 Canada Census

Ethnic groups: 60.7% White, 8.9% Black, 7.0% South Asian, 5.3% Arab, 4.6% Chinese, 4.1% Indigenous, 2.2% Southeast Asian, 2.0% Filipino, 1.4% Latin American, 1.4% West Asian

Languages: 60.3% English, 6.5% French, 4.2% Arabic, 2.0% Mandarin, 1.7% Italian, 1.4% Spanish, 1.2% Somali, 1.2% Cantonese, 1.1% Vietnamese, 1.0% Tagalog

Religions: 49.3% Christian (26.3% Catholic, 4.0% Anglican, 3.7% United Church, 2.3% Christian Orthodox, 1.3% Pentecostal, 1.0% Presbyterian, 10.7% Other), 10.8% Muslim, 3.3% Hindu, 1.8% Jewish, 1.5% Buddhist, 31.5% None

Median income: $42,800 (2020)

Average income: $55,900 (2020)

Members of Parliament

This riding has elected the following Members of Parliament:

In the 2004 federal election, Marlene Catterall defeated Conservative Party candidate Sean Casey in a very close election.

In the 2006 federal election, Catterall stepped aside, and high-profile Progressive Conservative Member of Provincial Parliament, John Baird, contested and won the riding for the Conservative Party.

Until February 3, 2015, he was a member of the cabinet of Prime Minister Stephen Harper as Minister of Foreign Affairs. He has also previously served as President of the Treasury Board, then Minister of the Environment, then as Government House Leader. Baird resigned from the House of Commons on March 16, 2015.

Election results

See also

 List of Canadian federal electoral districts
 Past Canadian electoral districts

References

Notes

External links
 Website of the Parliament of Canada
 2011 results from Elections Canada
 Campaign expense data from Elections Canada
 Politwitter
 Project Democracy - includes polling data
 Pundit's Guide - electoral history to present
 StatsCan District Profile
 Ottawa West-Nepean Federal Liberal Association

Federal electoral districts of Ottawa
Ontario federal electoral districts
1996 establishments in Ontario